Candidae is a family of gymnolaematan bryozoans (sea mats).

Genera 

 Amastigia Busk, 1852
 Aquiloniella Vieira, Spencer Jones, Winston, Migotto & Marques, 2014
 Aspiscellaria Vieira, Spencer Jones, Winston, Migotto & Marques, 2014
 Bathycellaria Vieira, Spencer Jones, Winston, Migotto & Marques, 2014
 Bobinella d'Hondt, 1981
 Caberea Lamouroux, 1816
 Canda Lamouroux, 1816
 Candoscrupocellaria d'Hondt & Gordon, 1996
 Cradoscrupocellaria Vieira, Spencer Jones & Winston, 2013
 Eupaxia Hasenbank, 1932
 Licornia van Beneden, 1850
 Maplestonia MacGillivray, 1885
 Menipea Lamouroux, 1812
 Monartron Canu & Bassler, 1929
 Notoplites Harmer, 1923
 Paralicornia Vieira, Spencer Jones, Winston, Migotto & Marques, 2014
 Penemia Gordon, 1986
 Pomocellaria Vieira, Spencer Jones, Winston, Migotto & Marques, 2014
 Scrupocaberea Vieira, Spencer Jones, Winston, Migotto & Marques, 2014
 Scrupocellaria van Beneden, 1845
 Scrupocellarinella d'Hondt & Schopf, 1985
 Sinocellaria Vieira, Spencer Jones, Winston, Migotto & Marques, 2014
 Tricellaria Fleming, 1828

References

Further reading
Badve, R. M., and M. A. Sonar. "Some fossil neocheilostomine bryozoans from the Holocene of the west coast of Maharashtra and Goa, India." Jour. Palaeontol. Soc. India 42 (1997): 35–48.
GORDON, Dennis. "Bryozoa of New Caledonia." Compendium of marine species of New Caledonia. Documents scientifiques et techniques (2006): 157–168.
Vieira, Leandro M., et al. "Evidence for polyphyly of the genus Scrupocellaria (Bryozoa: Candidae) based on a phylogenetic analysis of morphological characters." PLoS ONE 9.4 (2014): e95296.
Vieira, Leandro M., et al. "Evidence for polyphyly of the genus Scrupocellaria (Bryozoa: Candidae) based on a phylogenetic analysis of morphological characters." PLoS ONE 9.4 (2014): e95296.

Cheilostomatida
Animals described in 1851